Radek Štěpánek was the defending champion, but chose to compete the Beijing Summer Olympics instead.

Third-seeded Juan Martín del Potro won in the final 6–1, 7–6(7–2), against Andy Roddick.

Seeds
The top four seeds receive a bye into the second round.

Draw

Finals

Top half

Bottom half

External links
 Draw
 Qualifying draw

Singles